Mads Reginiussen (born 2 January 1988) is a Norwegian footballer who plays as a midfielder for Ranheim.

He signed a contract with Tromsø in 2009 and made his debut on 24 May 2009 against Lyn, a game they won 1-0.

He was loaned out to Ranheim in 2011, before he joined the club permanently in 2012.

He is the brother of Tore Reginiussen and Christian Reginiussen.

Career statistics

References

1988 births
Living people
People from Alta, Norway
Norwegian footballers
Alta IF players
Tromsø IL players
Ranheim Fotball players
Eliteserien players
Norwegian First Division players
Association football midfielders
Sportspeople from Troms og Finnmark